Plavecké Podhradie is a village and municipality in western Slovakia in the Malacky District in the Bratislava region.

History
In historical records the village was first mentioned in 1247 AD.

Geography
The village lies at an altitude of 256 metres and covers an area of 21.188 km².

Population
On 31 December 2011, it had a population of 686 people.

Infrastructure
Plavecké Podhradie lies on the street from Lozorno and Jablonica. It can be reached by train from Zohor, seasonally also by trains starting in Záhorská Ves on the border to Austria.

Sights
The Plavecky Castle and few caves in the Little Carpathians are located nearby. There is also old Celtic oppidum, renaissance chateau of Pállfy family and ruins of medieval monastery.

Plavecky castle (remains)

The original castle was built in the 13th century. The middle part consisted of a Gothic castle with rectangular tower and the palace. In the 16th century it was expensively rebuilt into renaissance fortress with low courtyards. It was continually fortified and maintained during the 17th century, when new cannon bastions were built. In 1706 it was damaged by the army and so became dilapidated in the 18th century. The remains are visible from surrounding environment, part of Zahorie district can be seen from the remains. Water font is located near the remains.

Gallery

References

External links

 Official page
https://web.archive.org/web/20070513023228/http://www.statistics.sk/mosmis/eng/run.html

Villages and municipalities in Malacky District